Vijayanagara Sri Krishnadevaraya University, Ballari, (VSKU) is a public university established in 2010 by the Government of Karnataka in Ballari district of Karnataka, India through the Karnataka State Universities Act, 2000. It has been named after Krishnadevaraya, former emperor of the Vijayanagara Empire. VSKU previously was a post graduate center of Gulbarga University, Kalaburagi and later become independent university in the year 2010. Recently VSKU has celebrated its Decennial ceremony on 27 July 2020.

VSKU has jurisdiction of three districts: Ballari, Koppal and Vijayanagara district. It has three post graduate centers, the main campus Jnana Sagara is at Vinayaka Nagar, Ballari which is spread at about 95.37 acres, houses all the key administrative departments of the university as well as 19 post graduate departments with 21 post graduate programmes. Among three post graduate centers  one of the center is located at Nandihalli in Sandur tehsil of Ballari district which currently offers 10 post graduate programs. Another two campuses  were started at Koppal (Established in 2016) and Yelburga (Established in 2017) tehsil, both in Koppal district, offering 10 and 7 post graduate programs respectively.

History

Departments of Pure Sciences and Technology
Department of Biochemistry

Department of Biotechnology

Department of Botany

Department of Chemistry

Department of Industrial Chemistry

Department of Computer Science

Department of Mathematics

Department of Physics

Department of Zoology

Departments of Social Sciences and Humanities

▪️Department of History and Archeology

▪️Department of Political science

▪️Department of Sociology

▪️Department of Journalism and Mass communication

▪️Department of MSW

Departments of Language Studies

▪️Department of English

Post graduate centers

Post Graduate Center Koppal(PGCK)

Post Graduate Center Nandihalli (PGCN) Sandur

Post Graduate Center Yelburga (PGCY)

Library

References

External links 
 Official Website 

Universities in Karnataka
Education in Bellary
Universities and colleges in Bellary district
Educational institutions established in 2010
2010 establishments in Karnataka